The Labor, Welfare and Health Committee of the Knesset deals with labor, employment and welfare matters, which operates continuously from the first Knesset until the dissolution of the 20th Knesset. After not being filled during the 21st and 22nd Knessets due to the lack of a government, in the 23rd Knesset, the Knesset plenum approved the proposal of the organizing committee to establish it as a special committee on welfare and labor that will operate until the establishment of the standing committees. The special committee was headed by Aida Touma-Suleiman from the Joint List, until Haim Katz was elected to chair the committee. Following the formation of the Israeli government, the committee was split - into the Labor and Welfare Committee, and the Health Committee. The chair of the Labor and Welfare Committee is Efrat Raytan from the Labor Party, and the chair of the Health Committee is Idit Silman from Yamina party.

Chair

References

Committees of the Knesset